Jack Murphy Gordon (February 13, 1931 – March 4, 1982) was a United States district judge of the United States District Court for the Eastern District of Louisiana.

Education and career
Born in Lake Charles, Louisiana, Gordon received a Bachelor of Science degree from Louisiana State University in 1951 and a Juris Doctor from the Paul M. Hebert Law Center at Louisiana State University in 1954. He was in private practice in New Orleans, Louisiana from 1954 to 1971, also serving as a judge advocate in the United States Air Force Judge Advocate General's Corps from 1954 to 1956.

Federal judicial service

On April 14, 1971, Gordon was nominated by President Richard Nixon to a new seat on the United States District Court for the Eastern District of Louisiana created by 84 Stat. 294. He was confirmed by the United States Senate on June 18, 1971, and received his commission on June 22, 1971, serving thereafter until his death of a heart attack on March 4, 1982, in Metairie, Louisiana.

References

Sources

1931 births
1982 deaths
Louisiana State University Law Center alumni
United States Air Force Judge Advocate General's Corps
Judges of the United States District Court for the Eastern District of Louisiana
United States district court judges appointed by Richard Nixon
20th-century American judges
United States Air Force officers
20th-century American lawyers
People from Lake Charles, Louisiana
Military personnel from Louisiana